The American Music Award for Artist of the Year, which is the most prestigious award of the night, has been awarded since 1996. Years reflect the year during which the awards were presented, for works released in the previous year (until 2003 onward, when awards were handed out on November of the same year). The all-time biggest winner in this category is Taylor Swift with 7 
wins. Swift is also the most nominated artist with 9 nominations, the first artist ever to be nominated in the category for five years in a row and the only act to win the award for three years in a row.

Winners and nominees

1990s

2000s

2010s

2020s

Multiple wins

Multiple nominations

 9 nominations
 Taylor Swift

 5 nominations
 Drake

 4 nominations
 Katy Perry
 Justin Bieber
 Ariana Grande

 3 nominations
 Ed Sheeran
 Eminem
 Lady Gaga
 Rihanna
 Post Malone

 2 nominations
 Alicia Keys
 Beyoncé
 Bruno Mars
 Carrie Underwood
 Green Day
 Imagine Dragons
 Justin Timberlake
 Lil Wayne
 Luke Bryan
 Norah Jones
 One Direction
 The Weeknd

References

American Music Awards